Olivea is a genus of rust fungi in the family Chaconiaceae. The widespread genus contains eight species that grow on dicots, especially the tropical flowering plant family Verbenaceae.

The genus name of Olivea is in honour of Edgar William Olive (1870-1971), who was an American botanist (Algology and Mycology) who was a Professor of Botany at the University of Wisconsin–Madison and Harvard University. 

The genus was circumscribed by Joseph Charles Arthur in Mycologia vol.9 on page 62 in 1917.

Species
As accepted by GBIF;
 Olivea capituliformis 
 Olivea colebrookeae 
 Olivea fimbriata 
 Olivea isonandrae 
 Olivea petitiae 
 Olivea scitula 
 Olivea tectonae 
 Olivea viticis

References

External links

Pucciniales